James Richard Young (17 February 1853 – 25 April 1937) was the first North Carolina Commissioner of Insurance.

Born in 1853 in what was then Granville County, North Carolina, Young was educated at Hampden-Sydney College and established an insurance agency in Henderson. He also became the first clerk of court for the new county of Vance and served from 1881-1890. Before 1880 he married Annie Eliza Southerland (1857–1894), with whom he had at least four children.

In 1899, the North Carolina General Assembly elected Young the first state insurance commissioner, upon which he sold his insurance agency. He was later appointed by Gov. Charles B. Aycock to continue in the post. When the Constitution of North Carolina was amended to make the office popularly elected, Young was elected in the general election of 1908 and subsequently re-elected until retiring after the 1920 election.

While serving as insurance commissioner, Young served as an elder at First Presbyterian Church (Raleigh, North Carolina). Young died in 1937 and is interred at the Elmwood Cemetery in Henderson.

References

NC Manual of 1913, page 90
NC Manual of 1913, page 245

North Carolina Commissioners of Insurance
1853 births
1937 deaths
American Presbyterians
Hampden–Sydney College alumni
People from Henderson, North Carolina